Vivian K. Mushahwar  is an American-Canadian biomedical engineer. She is a Canada Research Chair in Functional Restoration at the University of Alberta and Fellow of the Canadian Academy of Health Sciences.

Early life and education 
Mushahwar was born in Jerusalem to a young Palestinian couple as the second of three children. She enrolled at Brigham Young University for her Bachelor of Science degree in electrical engineering before completing her PhD at the University of Utah. During her undergraduate career, Mushahwar focused on learning neurophysiology and neuroscience but she chose to pursue human application as a career after being approach during a conference as a graduate student. As such, Mushahwar completed postdoctoral work in rehabilitative medicine at Emory University and at the University of Alberta (U of A).

Career 
Following her postdoctoral fellowship, Mushahwar remained at the University of Alberta due to funding and the interdisciplinary interaction between engineering and neuroscience. Upon joining the institution as a faculty member, she oversaw two laboratories; the Spinal Cord Injury & Neuroprostheses and Human Rehabilitation Engineering to restore function to limbs following spinal cord injuries. During her early tenure at U of A, Mushahwar co-developed a device that increases weak nerve signals on the spinal cord to potentially allow paraplegics to walk. She eventually received funding from the Alberta Heritage Foundation for Medical Research to support her research for five years as she moved from animals to human subjects. The aim of the device was to allow for electronic stimulation of damaged nerves in the spinal cord to produce muscular movement. Mushahwar later released a prototype of Smart-e-Pants, a custom electric underwear that helps prevent pressure ulcers or bedsores, and Smart On-going Circulatory Compressions to prevent deep vein thrombosis and circulatory problems.

In 2013, Mushahwar co-established a Centre for Neural Interfaces and Rehabilitation Neuroscience to assist her research in mobility issues. She was also appointed director of the Sensory Motor Adaptive Rehabilitation Technology (SMART) Network to oversee the development of smart medical devices and rehabilitative interventions to improve quality the functionality for people with neural injuries and diseases. As a result of her research and academic accomplishments, Mushahwar was also appointed a special advisor in Functional Electrical Stimulation Technologies at Glenrose Rehabilitation Hospital.

Prior to the 2019–2020 academic year, Mushahwar was appointed a Canada Research Chair in Functional Restoration to support her research in restoring mobility for Canadians living with spinal cord injury. While serving in this new role, she was also recognized as a Killam Professor. The following academic year, Mushahwar was elected a Fellow of the Canadian Academy of Health Sciences for "pioneer[ing] the development of micro-implants for stimulating the spinal cord to restore standing and walking after paralysis."

References

External links

Living people
Date of birth missing (living people)
Scientists from Jerusalem
Canadian biomedical engineers
Palestinian women academics
American biomedical engineers
University of Utah alumni
Brigham Young University alumni
Academic staff of the University of Alberta
Canada Research Chairs
Fellows of the Canadian Academy of Health Sciences
Year of birth missing (living people)